Pandit Tarun Bhattacharya (born 23 December 1957) is an Indian classical musician who plays the santoor, a type of hammered dulcimer. He studied with Ravi Shankar. He was awarded the Sangeet Natak Akademi Award for 2018.

Early life
Tarun Bhattacharya was born on 23 December 1957 in Howrah (the twin city of Calcutta), India. He was a commerce graduate from one of the most reputed colleges of Calcutta, and after a few brief years of professional life he started learning music from his father, Rabi Bhattacharya. He later honed his skills under Dulal Roy and finally began learning under Ravi Shankar.

Career

Bhattacharya is the inventor of "mankas" or fine tuners that help in quick tuning of the santoor. His technique of playing the santoor facilitates the playing of "Krintans, Ekharatans, Boltans" broadening the use of santoor in various traditional art forms. His improvisations on the shape and string arrangements have resulted in a deeper and more classical sound for the santoor.

He has endorsed the End Polio Now campaign of Rotary International as its ambassador. He has been recognized by the Indian National Polio Plus Committee both at the India Habitat Centre and the Calcutta Press Club for his role in promoting the cause.

An audio CD with a raga created by Tarun was released by the singer Girija Devi at the ITC Sangeet Research Academy in September 2017.

Awards and citations

Discography
 Song of Nature, Flame of the Forest (1992) with Vishwa Mohan Bhatt on mohan veena and Ronu Majumdar on bansuri
 Essence of Jugalbandi (1993) with Ronu Majumdar
 Sargam (1995) (Music of the World) 
 Kirvani (1996), featuring an original raga and three shorter pieces (Music of the World)
 Mental Bliss (1998), Bikram Ghosh, tabla
 Nomad Christmas (1997), various artists (Music of the World)
 Santoor (2000)
 Hypnotic Santoor (2001)
 Transcendence (2005)
 Aahir Bhairav & Gurjari Todi (2009) - Label: Questz World
 The Exotic Santoor (Reissued 2010)- Label: Aimrec - Available from Amazon.com

References

External links
 

Hindustani instrumentalists
Living people
Santoor players
Indian male classical musicians
People from Howrah
Pupils of Ravi Shankar
Musicians from West Bengal
1957 births
Recipients of the Sangeet Natak Akademi Award